Albert Richard Nixon (April 11, 1886 – November 9, 1960) was an American professional baseball outfielder. He played in Major League Baseball (MLB) for the Brooklyn Robins, Boston Braves, and Philadelphia Phillies between 1915 and 1928.

He helped the Robins win the 1916 National League Pennant.

In 9 seasons he played in 422 Games and had 1,345 At Bats, 180 Runs, 372 Hits, 60 Doubles, 13 Triples, 7 Home runs, 118 RBIs, 19 Stolen bases, 66 Walks, .277 Batting average, .314 On-base percentage, .356 Slugging percentage, 479 Total bases and 29 Sacrifice hits. Defensively, he recorded a .980 fielding percentage playing at all three outfield positions.

He died in Opelousas, Louisiana at the age of 74.

References

Sources

1886 births
1960 deaths
Major League Baseball outfielders
Brooklyn Robins players
Boston Braves players
Philadelphia Phillies players
Baseball players from New Jersey
Sportspeople from Atlantic City, New Jersey
Portsmouth Pirates players
Macon Peaches players
Beaumont Oilers players
Shreveport Gassers players
Houston Buffaloes players
Beaumont Exporters players
Portland Beavers players
Minor league baseball managers